Gordon Ramsay is a British celebrity chef.

Gordon Ramsay may also refer to:

People
Other people named Gordon Ramsay include:

 Gordon Ramsay (footballer), Australian footballer
 Gordon Ramsay (politician), Australian politician
 Gordon Ramsay, former Chief of Police for the Wichita Police Department in Wichita, Kansas

Other uses
 Restaurant Gordon Ramsay at Royal Hospital Road, Chelsea, London, England, UK; a restaurant
 Gordon Ramsay at Claridge's, Mayfair, London, England, UK; a restaurant
Gordon Ramsay's 24 Hours to Hell and Back, US restaurant restoration program hosted by Chef Gordon Ramsay

See also

 List of restaurants owned or operated by Gordon Ramsay, the celebrity chef
 Gordon Ramsey, American actor
 Gordon (disambiguation)
 Ramsay (disambiguation)